Salt fingering is a mixing process, example of double diffusive instability, that occurs when relatively warm, salty water overlies relatively colder, fresher water. It is driven by the fact that heated water diffuses more readily than salty water. A small parcel of warm, salty water sinking downwards into a colder, fresher region will lose its heat before losing its salt, making the parcel of water increasingly denser than the water around it and sinking further. Likewise, a small parcel of colder, fresher water will be displaced upwards and gain heat by diffusion from surrounding water, which will then make it lighter than the surrounding waters, and cause it to rise further. Paradoxically, the fact that salinity diffuses less readily than temperature means that salinity mixes more efficiently than temperature due to the turbulence caused by salt fingers.

Salt fingering was first described mathematically by Professor Melvin Stern of Florida State University in 1960 and important field measurements of the process have been made by Raymond Schmitt of the Woods Hole Oceanographic Institution and Mike Gregg and Eric Kunze of the University of Washington, Seattle. A particularly interesting area for salt fingering is found in the Caribbean Sea, where it is responsible for producing a "staircase" of well-mixed layers a few metres in thickness that extend for hundreds of kilometres.

Pre-dating the work of Stern, a paper by the American oceanographer Henry Stommel discussed the creation of a large-scale salt finger in which a column of water would be surrounded by a membrane that would allow diffusion of temperature but not salinity. Once primed by the upward movement of the colder and fresher intermediate water, the resultant "perpetual salt fountain" would be able to draw energy (heat) from the local ocean water stratification.

References

Gregg, M.C., (1988). Mixing in the thermohaline staircase east of Barbados. In Small Scale Turbulence and Mixing in the Ocean, eds. J.C.J. Nihoul and B.M. Jamart, Elsevier Oceanography Ser., 46, 453-470.
Kunze, Eric, (1987). Limits on growing, finite–length salt fingers: A Richardson number constraint. Journal of Marine Research., 45, 533-556.
Schmitt, Raymond W. The Ocean's Salt Fingers. Scientific American, May 1995, pp. 70–75.
Turner, J.S., (1973). Buoyancy effects in fluids. Cambridge University Press, pp. 251–287 (chapter 8).
Stern, Melvin E., (1960). The ”salt-fountain” and thermohaline convection. Tellus, 12,172-175.
Stommel, H., Arons, A.B., & Blanchard, D. (1956). An oceanographic curiosity: the perpetual salt fountain. Deep-Sea Research, 3,152-153.

External links
Salt Fingering

Physical oceanography